This article presents a list of the historical events and publications of Australian literature during 1878.

Books 

 Harriet Miller Davidson — The Hamiltons : A Story of Australian Life

Poetry 

 G. Herbert Gibson — "The Free-Selector's Daughter"
 Henry Kendall
 "The Names Upon a Stone : Inscribed to G. L. F."
 "Narrara Creek"
 Peter Dodds McCormick — "Advance Australia Fair" 
 John Boyle O'Reilly — "The Dukite Snake"
 James Brunton Stephens — "Marsupial Bill"
 Garnet Walch — "A Little Tin Plate"

Births 

A list, ordered by date of birth (and, if the date is either unspecified or repeated, ordered alphabetically by surname) of births in 1878 of Australian literary figures, authors of written works or literature-related individuals follows, including year of death.

 24 May — Mary Grant Bruce, writer for children (died 1958)
 10 August — Louis Esson, poet and dramatist (died 1943)

Deaths 

A list, ordered by date of death (and, if the date is either unspecified or repeated, ordered alphabetically by surname) of deaths in 1878 of Australian literary figures, authors of written works or literature-related individuals follows, including year of birth.

 8 August — John Dunmore Lang, poet and politician (born 1799)

See also 
 1878 in poetry
 List of years in literature
 List of years in Australian literature
1878 in literature
 1877 in Australian literature
1878 in Australia
1879 in Australian literature

References

Literature
Australian literature by year
19th-century Australian literature
1878 in literature